International Alert is a global peacebuilding charity. It offers dialogue, training, research, policy analysis, advocacy and outreach activities focusing on solving the root causes of conflict with people from across divides.

For over 30 years, International Alert has been working to build positive peace and reduce violence. Working across conflict lines and with all parties to conflicts.

International Alert GB's headquarters are in Oval, London Borough of Lambeth and maintains a European office in The Hague. International Alert GB had a total income of £17.6m in 2019/20. It had 300 employees operating in nineteen countries, and used the services of 23,000 volunteers. 

It works with over 800 partner organisations on projects to advance conflict resolution and support human rights. Alert's main geographic areas of operation are Africa, Asia and the Middle East. But it also supports peace activities in Colombia, the Caucasus and Ukraine.

Michael Young was the chief executive officer from September 2019 until February 2021, when he was replaced by Nic Hailey, who became the Executive Director in 2021.

Alert's Board of Trustees chairman is retired US ambassador Carey Cavanaugh, a former peace mediator.

History
One of the first non-governmental organizations created with a specific focus on conflicts and their resolution, International Alert can be seen as a daughter of Amnesty International, indeed it involved the same combination of elites as founding members drawn from the political, legal and academic fields – and a similar formatting of expertise (fact-finding missions and reporting). It did not however, adopt Amnesty International's practice of denunciation, seeking instead to combine operational engagement with policy research.  Alert's distinctive identity reflected its desire to provide a link between research and practice in dealing with armed conflicts on the one hand and human rights, humanitarianism, and development on the other.

In 1985 the Standing International Forum on Ethnic Conflict, Development and Human Rights (SIFEC) was founded with the purpose of addressing the issue of conflict and to alert governments and the world to developing crises. The following year, SIFEC merged with the US organization International Alert on Genocide and Massacres to become International Alert (IA).  Alert was founded in 1986 by Leo Kuper, Michael Young, Martin Ennals and Luis Kutner in response to growing frustration in the international development and human rights community that internal conflicts were impeding the ability to protect and provide for civilian populations and that there was no effective international mechanism to address this situation.  International Alert undertook to advance research on the causes of such conflict and to promote all means of conciliation and resolution, becoming an early advocate of multi track diplomacy.  From its first days, the conflict in Sri Lanka was a particular focus.  Dutch jurist Theo Van Boven was its first chairman; Nobel Peace Prize Laureate Archbishop Desmond Tutu, the former Archbishop of Cape Town served as Vice Chairman of its Board of Trustees, along with Mexican sociologist Rodolfo Stavenhagen.

Leadership
Martin Ennals, the former Secretary General of Amnesty International and founder of Article 19, served as Secretary General of the new organization. From 1986 to 1989, Ennals was International Alert's only full-time staff member.  He was joined by Andy Carl (later the founder of Conciliation Resources, who managed IA from 1992 to 1993 following Ennals' death.  Alert expanded rapidly in 1994–1998 under the leadership of Sri Lankan Kumar Rupesinghe, growing to over 50 staff with major programs in Sri Lanka, Burundi, and Sierra Leone. Australian Kevin P. Clements served as General Secretary from 1998 to 2002.  By 1998 Alert had a budget of approximately £5 million and 80 staff, managing programs in over 15 countries in conflict.

Dan Smith, now Secretary General of the Stockholm International Peace Research Institute served as Secretary General from 2002 to 2015. From 2015 to 2019, Harriet Lamb, CEO of the United Kingdom Fairtrade Foundation for over a decade. became International Alert's CEO.  Michael Young, formerly with the International Rescue Committee and Mercy Corps led the organization for the year following Lamb's departure.

In September 2021, former British diplomat Nic Hailey became executive director of International Alert.  In addition to serving in London as Africa Director and in the Foreign Secretary's Office, Hailey had diplomatic postings to Washington, DC, Paris, Berlin and Kabul, and served as British High Commissioner to Kenya.  His final government position was Director General - Transformation, leading the merger of the Foreign and Commonwealth Office and the Department for International Development.

Board members
International Alert's board of trustees is composed of the following members: Carey Cavanaugh, Richard Langstaff (Honorary Treasurer), Hans Bolscher, Emine Bozkurt, Nina Fallentin Caspersen, Chris Deri, Abir Haj Ibrahim,  Lisa L. Rose, and Erin Segilia-Chase.  Cavanaugh became board chair in 2018.

Notable initiatives

Data mining for conflict prevention

International Alert was an early advocate for the development of conflict early warning systems. Its work on gender and peacebuilding was important in establishing the necessity of incorporating gender relations and female stakeholders in conflict early warning systems.

By the early 1990s, International Alert was using the HURIDOCS database in conjunction with early Internet conferencing systems, to enable it to keep abreast of and interact with "local and international nongovernmental organizations and international experts." Through the mid-1990s, by applying a combination of manual and automated analysis in conjunction with such systems, researchers collaborating with International Alert performed early data mining research, demonstrating the viability of this approach for predicting conflict outcomes and encouraging the development of a website for the African Union's Continental Early Warning System (CEWS).

Millennium Peace Prize for Women
In 2001, as part of International Alert's Women Building Peace campaign, the organisation collaborated with the United Nations Development Fund for Women awarded a Millennium Peace Prize for Women.

Peacehack
In 2015 and 2016, International Alert organised a series of hackathons called Peace hack, exploring ways information technology might be used to reduce conflict by discouraging hate speech.

Conflict Café

Conflict Café is designed to champion "peace through food".  First established in 2014 as Conflict Kitchen London, this annual program fosters increased public awareness and understanding of key conflict and peace issues.  Each year a pop-up restaurant is set up in London which offers cuisine prepared by chefs from a specific conflict region – Syria, Armenia, Turkey, Lebanon, Sri Lanka, Myanmar.  For several nights, over these meals, the general public has an opportunity to meet with active Peace building practitioners and policymakers and learn firsthand about peoples affected by violent conflict.

References

Charities based in London
International charities
International organisations based in London
Organisations based in the London Borough of Lambeth
Peace organisations based in the United Kingdom